Wyche is a surname, and may refer to:
 C. Thomas Wyche (1926–2015), American lawyer and conservationist
 Charles Cecil Wyche (1885–1966), judge
 Cyril Wyche (1632–1707), president of the Royal Society
 Cyril Wyche (Wyche baronets) (1695–1756), 1st Baronet, Ambassador to Russia
 Ira T. Wyche (1887–1981), American major general
 James Wyche (born 1982), American football player
 Jane Wyche (17th century), wife of John Granville, 1st Earl of Bath
 Larry D. Wyche, retired U.S. Army Lieutenant General
 Nathaniel Wyche (1607–1659), president of the English East India Company
 Peter Wyche (ambassador) (1593–1643), English Ambassador to the Ottoman Empire
 Peter Wyche (diplomat) (1628–1699), English Ambassador to Russia and Poland
 Richard Wyche aka Richard of Chichester (1197–1253), Saint and Bishop of Chichester
 Richard Wyche (merchant) (1554–1621), director of the English East India Company
 Sam Wyche (1945–2020), former American football coach and player
 Sid Wyche (1922–1983), American songwriter
 Steve Wyche (born 1966), American football journalist and broadcaster
 Zelma Wyche (1918–1999), Louisiana politician and African-American civil rights activist
 Rachel Wyche (2003), Feminist, environmentalist and writer

See also
 Wyche Fowler, former U.S. Senator and Ambassador
 Wyche, Virginia, community in Brunswick County, U.S.
 Wyche, Worcestershire, suburb of Malvern, England
 Wyche Island, Antarctica
 Dark Eldar, elements of a work of fiction: wych cult
 Droitwich, England, settlement for which Wyche was an old name